Jairulla Jaitulla (born 4 December 1953) is a Filipino former swimmer. He competed at the 1972 Summer Olympics and the 1984 Summer Olympics.

References

1953 births
Living people
Filipino male swimmers
Olympic swimmers of the Philippines
Swimmers at the 1972 Summer Olympics
Swimmers at the 1984 Summer Olympics
Place of birth missing (living people)
Asian Games medalists in swimming
Asian Games silver medalists for the Philippines
Asian Games bronze medalists for the Philippines
Swimmers at the 1970 Asian Games
Swimmers at the 1974 Asian Games
Swimmers at the 1978 Asian Games
Medalists at the 1970 Asian Games
Medalists at the 1974 Asian Games
Medalists at the 1978 Asian Games
Southeast Asian Games medalists in swimming
Southeast Asian Games gold medalists for the Philippines
Southeast Asian Games competitors for the Philippines
Southeast Asian Games silver medalists for the Philippines
Southeast Asian Games bronze medalists for the Philippines
Competitors at the 1977 Southeast Asian Games
21st-century Filipino people
20th-century Filipino people